Westward may refer to:
 The cardinal direction West
 Westward, Cumbria, a settlement in north-west England
 Westward (series), a series of games video created by Sandlot Games
 Westward Islet of Ducie Island
 Westward Television, a former ITV franchise in the South West of England
 , a motor yacht
 , a cruise ship operated by the Norwegian Cruise Line 1991—1994
 ASP Westward, a local newspaper company in Texas
 Westward (racing yacht), a museum ship in Tasmania

See also
 Westward Ho!
 Westword, a publication based in Denver, Colorado